Kirsten Johanne Alice Bishopric (September 6, 1963 – April 15, 2014), also known as Kirsten Bishop, was a Canadian actress best known providing the voices of Zoycite, Emerald, Kaorinite, and Badiyanu in the original English adaptation of the Sailor Moon series.

Personal life 

Bishopric was born on September 6, 1963, in Montreal, to JoAnn Blondal-Bishopric, a model and interior designer, and John Grenfell, who was a radio announcer at the local Canadian Broadcasting Corporation radio station. Her twin brother, Thor Bishopric, is an actor, writer, voice actor and voice director, and also a vice-president of ACTRA.

Bishop died from lung cancer in Toronto on April 15, 2014.

Filmography

Film

TV Series

References

External links

1963 births
2014 deaths
20th-century Canadian actresses
21st-century Canadian actresses
Actresses from Montreal
Anglophone Quebec people
Canadian people of Icelandic descent
Canadian voice actresses
Canadian film actresses
Canadian television actresses
Dawson College alumni
Deaths from lung cancer in Ontario